Ushkhayta is a rural locality (a selo) in Kizhinginsky District, Republic of Buryatia, Russia. The population was 545 as of 2010. There are 9 streets.

Geography 
Ushkhayta is located 6 km southwest of Kizhinga (the district's administrative centre) by road. Kizhinga is the nearest rural locality.

References 

Rural localities in Kizhinginsky District